The St. Cyril and St. Methodius University of Veliko Tarnovo (Bulgarian Великотърновски университет „Св. св. Кирил и Методий“) is a Bulgarian university based in Veliko Tarnovo.

History 

The university was established on 15 September 1963. It inherited the cultural and education traditions of Turnovo Literary School. In the first academic year, 25 professors, assistants and teachers came from universities in Sofia and the Bulgarian Academy of Science. The first subjects were Bulgarian Philology, Russian Philology, History and Art. The university was founded by Aleksandar Burmov and Penio Rusev.

In 1971 the school was accredited as Veliko Tarnovo University "St. Cyril and St. Methodius".

Structure 
The university is divided into 9 faculties:
 Faculty of Economics
 Faculty of Education
 Faculty of Fine Arts
 Faculty of History
 Faculty of Law
 Faculty of Modern Languages
 Faculty of Orthodox Theology
 Faculty of Philosophy
 Faculty of Mathematics and Informatics

Rectors 

Alexander Burmov
Jelyo Avdjiev
Vladimir Popov
Stanio Georgiev
Ivan Stoyanov
Ivan Haralampiev
 Plamen Anatoliev Legkostup

See also 
 Balkan Universities Network
 List of colleges and universities

External links 
 

Educational institutions established in 1963
1963 establishments in Bulgaria
Universities in Veliko Tarnovo